The Fifteenth of September Legion was an anti-communist guerrilla group founded in Guatemala by exiled former junior officers of the defeated Nicaraguan National Guard, which was committed to overthrowing the Sandinista National Liberation Front government.

History
Based in Guatemala City, it received some support from Guatemala's National Liberation Movement. Eduardo Román, manager of boxer Alexis Argüello, also convinced Argüello to fund a radio station, Radio 15th of September. To finance itself, the Legion also staged kidnappings for ransom and bank robberies, called "special operations", in Guatemala and El Salvador. Local leftist guerrillas were already financing themselves through these acts, and the Legion rightly figured that leftists would be blamed. Argentina also began providing assistance.

In August 1981, at the behest of the Argentine junta and the Reagan administration, it merged with the Nicaraguan Democratic Union (UDN) to form the Nicaraguan Democratic Force (FDN). The FDN would eventually grow to become the dominant Contra rebels' faction in the 1980s.

Former Legion head, Lieutenant-colonel Enrique Bermúdez, became the military commander of the FDN's military wing.

See also
 Contras
 Nicaraguan revolution
 Somoza Family
 Sandinista Popular Army
 Mano Blanca

References

Further reading
Enrique Bermudez (with Michael Johns), "The Contras' Valley Forge: How I View the Nicaragua Crisis", Policy Review magazine, Summer 1988.

Contras
Guerrilla movements in Latin America
Organizations of the Nicaraguan Revolution